Bolinas-Stinson Union School District is a public school district in Marin County, California, with offices in Bolinas, California, USA.  As of the 2017–18 school year, the District had 91 students at its Bolinas campus.

History 
Bolinas School has been in continuous operation since 1858. The original wooden school-house was burned down in 1978 by an arsonist, but was rebuilt as a virtually exact replica of the original building. Until the fire, it was said to be the oldest standing school building in California.

Staff 
The District had 10.0 full-time-equivalent classroom teachers.  The other 15 staff included 8 instructional aides or coordinators, 1 administrator, and 6 support staff.  There were no guidance counselors or library staff.

Fiscal 
The District budget as of 2004-05 was $2,092,000, or $15,969 per student.  Revenue sources were 8% federal, 81% local, and 11% state.

Community demographics 
In 2000, the attendance area had a total population under age 18 of 477, of which 52 (8.0%) were Hispanic.

The racial composition was 
 White alone: 401 
 Black or African American alone: 15 
 American Indian or Alaska Native alone: 0 
 Asian alone: 13 
 Hawaiian or other Pacific Islander alone: 4 
 Some other race alone: 23 
 Population of two or more races: 21

Student demographics 
The majority of the students are white.  Students identified themselves by race or ethnicity and by gender as follows in 2017-18:
 Asian: 1
 Black: 4 
 Hispanic: 18 
 White: 58

There were no students identified as American Indian/Alaskan, Filipino, or Native Hawaiian or Pacific Islander.  Bolinas-Stinson is a Title I school with a School-Wide Program.

Bolinas Stinson School

Bolinas Campus 
Bolinas School had an enrollment of 91 students in third through eighth grade in 2004–05.  With 6.0 full-time-equivalent teachers, Bolinas had a student-teacher ratio of 15.1.  The campus is located approximately one mile east of the town of Bolinas, California, in an area known as Gospel Flats.  Bolinas is neither a charter or magnet school.

Stinson Beach Campus 
Stinson Beach School is located on State Route 1, one mile north of the town of Stinson Beach, California.  In 2004–05, it had an enrollment of 31 students in kindergarten through second grade, with 3.0 full-time-equivalent teachers.

Notes

External links 
 
 School Accountability Report Card (SARC)
 Marin County Office of Education, Marin County Public Schools, Bolinas-Stinson Union School District, pp 14-15 (pdf)
Marin County Office of Education, Map of Bolinas-Stinson Union School District boundaries (pdf)
 District Information at the National Center for Education Statistics

School districts in Marin County, California
West Marin
School districts established in 1858
Bolinas, California
1858 establishments in California